Ochoa ( or Otsoa) is a Spanish surname of Basque origin common throughout Spain, France, the Americas, and the Philippines. It is a surname of patronymic origin; it was originally a given name in Medieval Spain.

The name originated in the Basque Country and means "the wolf", from the Basque vocabulary word otso/otxo meaning "wolf" (the suffix -a in the Basque language represents the definite article). In Standard Basque, the name is spelled otsoa or otxoa. There was also a female given name Ochanda (meaning "female wolf", cf. the elegant tower in the old quarter of Vitoria-Gasteiz named after Ochanda, proper name of the daughter of a man responsible for revamping the tower in the 16th century) and Ochotorena or Otxotorena, meaning "son of Ochoto" (literally "small wolf"). The Spanish equivalent of this Basque given name was Lope, also appearing in the names of Gascon lords in the High Middle Ages.

Geographical distribution
As of 2014, 32.2% of all known bearers of the surname Ochoa were residents of Mexico (frequency 1:671), 12.1% of Colombia (1:686), 11.8% of the United States (1:5,302), 9.4% of Venezuela (1:556), 5.8% of Peru (1:949), 5.1% of Guatemala (1:547), 4.8% of Argentina (1:1,537), 4.8% of Ecuador (1:580), 3.1% of Honduras (1:492), 2.5% of Spain (1:3,191), 1.6% of Nicaragua (1:651), 1.4% of Cuba (1:1,390), 1.4% of Bolivia (1:1,286) and 1.3% of El Salvador (1:861).

In Spain, the frequency of the surname was higher than national average (1:3,191) in the following autonomous communities:
 La Rioja (1:310)
 Navarre (1:438)
 Basque Country (1:1,261)
 Cantabria (1:1,963)
 Aragon (1:2,024)
 Castilla-La Mancha (1:2,573)
 Community of Madrid (1:2,933)

In Honduras, the frequency of the surname was higher than national average (1:492) in the following departments:
 Choluteca (1:147)
 Francisco Morazán (1:309)
 Olancho (1:370)
 Valle (1:427)

People

 Alex Ochoa (born 1972), American baseball player
 Andre Ochoa (born 2002), American soccer player
 Arnaldo Ochoa (1930–1989), Cuban army general, executed for treason
 Baltazar Hinojosa Ochoa (born 1963), Mexican politician, mayor of Matamoros, Tamaulipas
 Blanca Fernández Ochoa (1963–2019), Spanish alpine skier
 Carla Ochoa (born 1979), Chilean fashion model
 Carlos Ochoa (born 1978), Mexican football (soccer) player
 Carlos José Ochoa (born 1980), Venezuelan cyclist
 Carlos M. Ochoa  (1920–2008), Peruvian botanist
 Digna Ochoa (1964–2001), Mexican human-rights lawyer
 Dominic Ochoa (born 1974), Filipino actor
 Annabelle Lopez Ochoa (born 1973), Belgium dance choreographer 
 Eduardo López Ochoa (1877–1936), Spanish army general, Africanist, and Freemason
 Eduardo M. Ochoa (born 1950), Argentine-American university president
 Eliades Ochoa (born 1946), Cuban guitarist and singer
 Ellen Ochoa (born 1958), first Mexican-American astronaut
 Estevan Ochoa (1831–1888), Mexican-born American businessman and politician
 Eugenio de Ochoa (1815–1872), Spanish author and translator
 Fabio Ochoa Restrepo (a.k.a. "Don Fabio") (1923–2002), Colombian businessman, father of the Ochoa brothers
 Francisco Fernández Ochoa (1950–2006), Spanish alpine skier
 Francisco Labastida Ochoa (born 1942), Mexican economist and politician
 Gabriel Ochoa Uribe (1929–2020), Colombian football player
 Gabriela Ochoa, Venezuelan British computer scientist
 Gilda Ochoa, American professor
 Gorka Otxoa (born 1979), Spanish actor
 Guillermo Ochoa (a.k.a. "Paco Memo") (born 1985), Mexican football (soccer) player
 Israel Ochoa (born 1964), Colombian cyclist
 Jesús Ochoa (footballer) (born 1981), Mexican-American football (soccer) player
 Jesús Ochoa (actor) (born 1959), Mexican actor
 Ochoa brothers, Colombian brothers Jorge, Juan David and Fabio Ochoa, former members of the Medellín drug cartel
 Leire Martínez Ochoa (born 1979), Spanish-Basque singer, vocalist of La Oreja de Van Gogh after Amaia Montero's departure
 Leonorilda Ochoa (1939–2016), Mexican actress
 Lorena Ochoa (born 1981), Mexican golfer
 Manuel Ochoa (born 1925), Exiled Cuban musician and conductor, founder of the Miami Symphony Orchestra
 Manuel López Ochoa (1933–2011), Mexican actor
 Mariana Ochoa (born 1979), Mexican actress and singer
 Paquito Ochoa, Jr. (born 1960), Filipino lawyer and politician
 Richard Ochoa (born 1984), Venezuelan track and road cyclist
 Samuel Ochoa (born 1986), Mexican football (soccer) player
 Severo Ochoa (1905–1993), Spanish biochemist, Nobel Laureate, Medicine, 1959
 Wendi Andriano (born 1970), born Wendi Ochoa, American murderer

Fictional characters
Pablo Belisario Ochoa, one of the five genetic fathers of Agent 47 in the Hitman series
 Detective Miguel Ochoa, character in the Nikki Heat novels based on Castle character Detective Javier Esposito.
Tony Ochoa, Mexican-American character played by Jacob Vargas in the Netflix series Mr Iglesias.

Other
Ochoa syndrome, rare congenital syndrome associated with facial expressions and hydronephrosis

References

Spanish-language surnames
Basque-language surnames